Michael Martin (born in Merrick, New York) is an American professional poker player from Washington Crossing, Pennsylvania who was the winner at the European Poker Tour (EPT) £5,200 EPT London Main Event earning £1,000,000.

Poker

World Series of Poker 
Martin has cashed eight times at the WSOP, most notably finishing in 232nd place at the 2006 World Series of Poker earning $42,882 out of a field of 8773 entries and finishing runner-up at the $5,000 No Limit Hold'em WSOP Circuit Championship event earning $94,263.

European Poker Tour 
Martin has made three final tables at the European Poker Tour, his first was at the EPT Grand Final, in Monte Carlo in season 4 finishing 5th for €421,000 ($666,171) with a final table that included online professional poker player Isaac "westmenloAA" Baron (4th), Luca Pagano (6th), Antonio Esfandiari (8th) and the winner Glen Chorny. Then later winning the 2008 EPT London event in season 5, earning £1,000,000 ($1,831,099) in a final table which included Team Pokerstars Pro member Marcin Horecki (3rd) and WSOP bracelet winner Alan Smurfit (6th).

Master Classics of Poker 
In November 2007, Martin was runner up at Amsterdam's prestigious Master Classics of Poker earning $531,961.  The Master Classics of Poker is one of the most respected and popular tournaments on the European calendar due to the excellent organization of the Holland Casino Amsterdam.

Epic Poker League 
In 2011, the Epic Poker League was launched. It is a series of poker tournaments begun in 2011 by Federated Sports + Gaming. The League is exclusionary in that it is only open to poker players who have met certain qualification criteria based on earnings, final tables and other criteria. Comparing itself to the PGA of Golf, this new league will be the avenue for the top professional poker players in the world to compete against each other.  To date, 218 of the world's best live tournament players have already qualified for the Epic Poker League and Martin was included in the initial induction to this league.  This inclusion ranks him amongst the top 218 tournament players in the world.

As of 2008, his total live tournament winnings exceed $3,200,000.

References

External links
 CardPlayer.com online profile – Michael "Martine23" Martin

American poker players
European Poker Tour winners
People from Bucks County, Pennsylvania
Year of birth missing (living people)
Living people
People from Merrick, New York